Singer of Songs is a studio album by American country artist Janie Fricke. It was released in May 1978 via Columbia Records and contained ten tracks. It was the debut studio album of Fricke's recording career and contained three songs that were released as singles to the country market. Its most successful single was a cover of "Please Help Me, I'm Fallin'", which reached the top 20 of the American country singles chart.

Background and content
Janie Fricke was a background vocalist and commercial jingle singer until she was signed by Columbia Records. Fricke would have a series of singles that would make her among the most successful country artists of the 1980s. Her first Columbia release was the 1977 song "What're You Doing Tonight". It was included on her debut studio album, which was recorded in sessions between June and November 1977. These sessions were produced by Billy Sherrill at the Columbia Recording Studio, located in Nashville, Tennessee. A total of ten songs comprised the collection. The album was mostly a collection of new recordings, with the exception of the song "Please Help Me, I'm Fallin'", which was a cover of the hit by Hank Locklin. In addition, "We Could Have Been the Closest of Friends", would also be recorded by Kenny Rogers around the same time for his album Love or Something Like It.

Release, reception and singles

Singer of Songs was released in May 1978 on Columbia Records, becoming Fricke's debut studio album as a solo artist. It was originally offered as a vinyl LP, with five songs on either side of the record. It was later released to digital and streaming platforms, including Apple Music. In promoting one of the singles from the album, an advertisement in Billboard magazine described Singer of Songs as "stunning". Meanwhile, critic Jim Worbois of AllMusic gave the project only 2.5 out of 5 possible stars. "Fricke has a big voice and gives the impression she can do a lot with it. She just never gets around to it on this record. Maybe it's the songs or maybe the arrangements, but she never seems to get into these songs or comes close to putting any emotion in her performances," he wrote.

"What're You Doing Tonight" was released as a single in August 1977. It spent 13 weeks on the Billboard Hot Country Songs chart and peaked at number 21 by November 1977. It was followed by "Baby It's You" as a single in February 1978. It also reached number 21 on the same chart. Fricke's cover of "Please Help Me, I'm Fallin'" was released as the final single in May 1978. The song became her highest-charting hit up to that point, reaching number 12 on the country songs chart by August 1978. All three singles reached charting positions on Canada's RPM Country chart, with "Please Help Me I'm Fallin" reaching number four.

Track listing

Vinyl version

Digital version

Personnel
All credits are adapted from the liner notes of Singer of Songs.

Musical personnel

 Beegie Adair – strings
 Tommy Allsup – guitar
 Bryon Bach – strings
 Phil Baugh – guitar
 Lea Jane Berinati – backing vocals
 George Binkley – strings
 Jimmy Capps – guitar
 Jerry Carrigan – drums
 John Catchings – strings
 Marvin Chantry – strings
 Roy Christensen – strings
 Virginia Christensen – strings
 Janie Fricke – lead vocals
 Carl Gorodetzky – strings
 Lennie Haight – strings
 Yvonne Hodges – backing vocals
 Ginger Holladay – backing vocals
 Jim Isbell – drums
 Shane Keister – keyboards
 Sheldon Kurland – strings
 Wilfred Lehmann – strings
 Hargus "Pig" Robbins – keyboards
 Don Roth – strings
 Billy Sanford – guitar
 Billy Sherrill – keyboards
 Devin Smith – strings
 Henry Strzelecki – bass
 Samuel Terranova – strings
 Gary Vanosdale – strings
 Jim Vest – steel guitar
 Pete Wade – guitar
 Carole Walker – strings
 Stephanie Woolf – strings
 Reggie Young – guitar

Technical personnel
 Lou Bradley – engineer
 Bill Justis – arrangements
 Slick Lawson – photography
 Billy Sherrill – producer
 Virginia Team – design

Release history

References

1978 debut albums
Albums produced by Billy Sherrill
Columbia Records albums
Janie Fricke albums